Arthrosphaera attemsi, is a species of pill millipedes in the family Arthrosphaeridae. It is native to India and Sri Lanka.

References

Sphaerotheriida
Millipedes of Asia
Animals described in 2001